London Elstree Aerodrome (ICAO: EGTR) is an operational general aviation aerodrome located in Elstree, and is situated 2.6 nautical miles (4.8 km; 3.0 mi) east of Watford, Hertfordshire, England.

Elstree Aerodrome has Civil Aviation Authority Ordinary Licence P486, which allows flights for the purpose of the public transport of passengers and for the purpose of instruction in flying. It is licensed for night flying. The licensee is Montclare Shipping Company Ltd.

The aerodrome has one asphalt runway (08/26) aligned roughly east–west. The runway is 651 meters (2,136 feet) in length making it suitable for most light aircraft up to the size of a King Air or Pilatus PC-12. The runway has a steep 9% gradient.

History

During the Second World War, Westland Lysander aircraft were tested at Elstree. Elstree also hosted a Link Trainer flight simulator. 124 Gliding School was formed at Elstree in August 1943.

The airfield is owned and operated by the Gibbs family, who have long been associated with the Elstree area.

Operations

The aerodrome was returned to civil aircraft operations in 1946. There is a large wartime built Bellman hangar and a number of smaller hangars.

Residents include aeroplane and helicopter schools, charter companies and maintenance services.

Some areas of the airfield are occasionally used for filming.

Airport information

Prior permission (PPR) is required to land. A flight information service for arriving, departing or transiting aircraft is provided by "Elstree Information" on the frequency of 122.405 MHz, and on the same frequency when required under the designation of "Elstree Radio" if the service requires downgrading due to staffing availability.

Accidents 
 
 24 August 2022: A Cessna 182Q, registration G-RBBK, clipped a vehicle while landing at Finmere Aerodrome. The 63 year old pilot declared an emergency and decided to return back to Elstree. It made a safe landing at Elstree and it was found no damage had been done to be aircraft. The AAIB concluded "The aircraft approached the aerodrome over a road lower than necessary to maintain a safe distance from traffic using the road."

References

Bibliography
Richard Riding and Grant Peerless, Elstree Aerodrome: The Past in Pictures, The History Press Ltd (26 November 2003), 192 pages.

External links

 Official Facebook site
 Elstree Aerodrome in 1986, at the BBC Domesday Project online, retrieved 22 Sep 2011

Airports in England
Airports in the London region
Transport in Hertfordshire
Aldenham